White Beach is a rural locality in the local government area (LGA) of Tasman in the South-east LGA region of Tasmania. The 2016 census recorded a population of 276 for the state suburb of White Beach.

History 
White Beach is a confirmed locality.

Geography
The waters of Storm Bay form the western to north-eastern boundaries.

Road infrastructure 
Route B37 (Nubeena Road) passes to the north-east. From there, White Beach Road provides access to the locality.

References

Towns in Tasmania
Localities of Tasman Council